Yangmingshan National Forest Park or National Forest Park of Mount Yangming is a national forest park located in northeastern Shuangpai County, Yongzhou, Hunan, China. Located in the suburb of Yongzhou, it is bordered by Guilin on the South, Xiao River on the West, Mount Heng on the North, and Yongzhou on the East.

History
In 1945 when Chiang Kai-shek presided a conference of senior military commanders, he visited the mountain in his free time.

In 1982 it was designated as a "Provincial-level Nature Protection Area" by the Hunan government.

In 1992 it was classified as a "National Forest Park" by the State Forestry Administration.

In September 2009 it was authorized as a "National Nature Reserve" by the State Council of China.

In 2012 it was categorized as a "4A-level Tourist Site" by the China National Tourism Administration.

In 2013 it was inscribed to the Prototype-zone of Ecotourism Attractions List by the Hunan government.

Geography

Yangmingshan National Forest Park is dominated by sandstone.

Pseudotsuga sinensis predominate in the mountain of forest. It also abounds with Taxus chinensis, Cephalotaxus fortunei, Torreya grandis, and Quercus hypargyrea (syn. Quercus multinervis).

Animals that inhabit the Yangmingshan National Forest Park are pangolin, musk deer, silver pheasant, Chinese giant salamander, hare, and pheasant.

Rivers
River with headwaters: Huangjiangyuan.

Climate

Tourism
Wanshou Temple is a Buddhist temple located in the mountain, the temple was first construction in the Song dynasty, rebuilt in the Ming dynasty.

A sea of azaleas in the mountain in spring each year.

Memorial Pavilion of the Red Army. On August 23, 1934, Ren Bishi, Wang Zhen and Xiao Ke led they soldiers to wipe out a whole enemy and slept on stones.

References

External links

Shuangpai
Parks in Yongzhou
Tourist attractions in Yongzhou